The Voyage Out is the first novel by Virginia Woolf, published in 1915 by Duckworth.

Development and first draft 
Woolf began work on The Voyage Out by 1910 (perhaps as early as 1907) and had finished an early draft by 1912.  The novel had a long and difficult gestation; it was not published until 1915, as it was written during a period in which Woolf was especially psychologically vulnerable. She suffered from periods of depression and at one point attempted suicide. The resultant work contained the seeds of all that would blossom in her later work: the innovative narrative style, the focus on feminine consciousness, sexuality and death.

In 1981, Louise DeSalvo published an alternate version of The Voyage Out featuring its original title, Melymbrosia. Professor DeSalvo worked for seven years on the project of reconstructing the text of the novel as it might have appeared in 1912, before Woolf had begun serious revisions. She reviewed more than 1,000 manuscript pages from Woolf's private papers, dating the earlier versions of the work by small organizational clues such as the color of ink used or noticing where a pen had last left off writing. DeSalvo's Melymbrosia attempts to restore the text of the novel as Woolf had originally conceived it, which contained more candid political commentary on such issues as homosexuality, women's suffrage, and colonialism. According to DeSalvo, Woolf was "warned by colleagues that publishing such an outspoken indictment of Britain could prove disastrous to her fledgling career". The work was heavily revised until it became the novel now known as The Voyage Out, which omits much of the political candour of the original. DeSalvo's edition was reissued by Cleis Press in 2002.

Plot 

Rachel Vinrace embarks for South America on her father's ship and is launched on a course of self-discovery in a kind of modern mythical voyage. The mismatched jumble of passengers provides Woolf with an opportunity to satirise Edwardian life. The novel introduces Clarissa Dalloway, the central character of Woolf's later novel, Mrs Dalloway. Two of the other characters were modelled after important figures in Woolf's life. St John Hirst is a fictional portrayal of Lytton Strachey and Helen Ambrose is to some extent inspired by Woolf's sister, Vanessa Bell. Rachel's journey from a cloistered life in a London suburb to freedom, challenging intellectual discourse, and self-discovery very likely reflects Woolf's own journey from a repressive household to the intellectual stimulation of the Bloomsbury Group. Toward the novel's end, Rachel Vinrace dies of a fever.

Critical reception 

Writing in 1926, E. M. Forster described it as "... a strange, tragic, inspired book whose scene is a South America not found on any map and reached by a boat which would not float on any sea, an America whose spiritual boundaries touch Xanadu and Atlantis". Reviewing the book a decade earlier, he wrote this: "It is absolutely unafraid... Here at last is a book which attains unity as surely as Wuthering Heights, though by a different path."

Literary scholar Phyllis Rose writes in her introduction to the novel, "No later novel of Woolf's will capture so brilliantly the excitement of youth." And also the excitement and challenge of life. "It's not cowardly to wish to live," says one old man at the end of the book. "It's the very reverse of cowardly. Personally, I'd like to go on for a hundred years... Think of all the things that are bound to happen!"

Notes

External links 
 
 
 
 Penguin Edition

1915 British novels
Novels by Virginia Woolf
Novels set in South America
Gerald Duckworth and Company books
1915 debut novels